The 17th congressional district of Illinois is represented by Democrat Eric Sorensen.  It includes most of the northwestern portion of the state, with most of its population living on the Illinois side of the Quad Cities, as well as parts of Peoria and Rockford. The district includes Tampico, the birthplace of former president Ronald Reagan.

The 17th congressional district has shifted northward after redistricting in 2012. It subsequently lost Quincy and Decatur, as well as its share of Springfield. It was generally thought that the redrawn map would allow the district to revert to the Democrats, who held it without interruption from 1983 to 2011. As expected, incumbent Representative Bobby Schilling was defeated, after serving only one term, by Democratic opponent Cheri Bustos in the 2012 election cycle, who served until 2023.

The boundaries were drawn in a bipartisan deal to protect both Democratic incumbent Lane Evans and neighboring Republican incumbents. The lines of the district were drawn to move Republican voters into neighboring districts and to include Democratic neighborhoods in Springfield and Decatur. Evans retired in 2006 as a result of declining health, and the seat was won by his longtime aide Phil Hare. Although the district had been designed to elect a Democrat, Hare lost in 2010 to Republican pizzeria owner Bobby Schilling. In 2012, Democrat Cheri Bustos won the district election.

In early 2021, Cheri Bustos announced her intention to retire at the end of the 117th congress. In November 2021, Former WREX and WQAD meteorologist Eric Sorenson announced his candidacy for the seat. He later won the election with 52% of the vote.

Geographic boundaries

2011 redistricting
The district covers parts of Peoria, Tazewell and Winnebago counties, and all of Carroll, Fulton, Henderson, Henry, Jo Daviess, Knox, Mercer, Rock Island, Stephenson, Warren and Whiteside counties, as of the 2011 redistricting which followed the 2010 census. All or parts of Canton, East Moline, Freeport, Galesburg, Kewanee, Moline, Peoria, Rock Island, Rockford, Pekin and Sterling are included. The representatives for these districts were elected in the 2012 primary and general elections, and the boundaries became effective on January 5, 2013.

2021 redistricting

As of the 2020 redistricting, this district will retain the Illinois side of the Quad Cities area where much of its population previously resided, while its southern borders will now extend further into Central Illinois. The district will take in parts of Henry, Warren, and McDonough Counties; half of Mercer, Stephenson, Tazewell, McLean, Fulton, and Peoria Counties; and all of Carroll, Rock Island, Whiteside, and Knox Counties.

Henry County is split between this district and the 16th district. They are partitioned on the northwest side by Shaffer Creek, Oakwood Cir, Oakmont Dr, Oakwood Country Club, Glenwood Rd, US Highway 6, E 450th St, Illinois Highway 280, Green River Rd, and Kings Dr. They are partitioned on the southeast side by E 1770th St, N 650th Ave/N 570th Ave, Timber Rd, E 2400th St, and N 1200 St. The 17th district takes in the municipalities of Colona, Kewanee, and Galva.

Warren County is split between this district and the 15th district. They are partitioned by 60th St and 180th Ave. The 17th district takes in the municipalities of Alexis and Monmouth.

McDonough County is split between this district and the 15th district. They are partitioned by US Highway 136, US Highway 67, N 1150th Rd, Grant St, Deer Rd, N 1200th St, S Quail Walk Rd, Jamestown Rd, Arlington Rd, La Moine River, Emory Rd, N 1400th Rd, Krohe Dr, E 1200th St, N 1800th Rd, and E 1900th St, N 1700th St, E 2000th St. The 17th district takes in the municipalities of Macomb and Bardolph.

Mercer County is split between this district and the 15th district. They are partitioned by 220th St. The 17th district takes in the municipalities of Burgess, Matherville, and Viola.

Stephenson County is split between this district and the 16th district. They are partitioned by Daws Rd, Howardsville Rd, Cedarville Rd, N Fawver Rd, and Maize Rd. The 17th district takes in the municipalities of Freeport, Pearl City, and Bolton.

Tazewell County is split between this district and the 16th district. They are partitioned by Illinois River, S 3rd St, Prince St, Elm St, Maple St, Mechanic St, Koch St, 5th St, Illinois Central Railroad, Townline Rd, Highway I-55, Illinois Highway 122, Indian Creek, Southwest Lincoln St, Southeast Main St, Hopedale Rd, Springtown Rd, Mackinaw Rd, and Lagoon Rd. The 17th district takes in the municipalities of Delavan and South Pekin.

McLean County is split between this district and the 16th district. They are partitioned by E 1000 North Rd, N 250 East Rd, E 1200 North Rd, Middle Fork Sugar Creek, E 1250 North Rd, N 750 East Rd, E 1300 North Rd, E 1280 North Rd, N 900 East Rd, E 1350 North Rd, E 1400 North Rd, N 1100 East Rd, N Rivian Motorway, King Mill Creek, Illinois Highway 74, Hovey Ave, S Cottage Ave, Gregory St, N Adelaide St, W Raab Rd, N Towanda Ave, E Shelbourne Dr, Old Route 66, Hershey Rd, E College Ave, Illinois Highway 55, Sugar Creek, General Electric Rd, Rainbow Ave, Mill Creek Rd, Clearwater Ave, Newcastle Dr, Illinois Highway 9, S Towanda Barnes Rd, Central Illinois Airport, Winchester Dr, S Hershey Rd, E Oakland Ave, S Veterans Parkway, S Mercer Ave, Norfolk and Southern Railroad, Rhodes Ln, E Hamilton Rd, S Morris Ave, Six Points Rd, W Oakland Ave, Fox Creek Rd, Crooked Creek Rd, Carrington Ln, and N 1200 East Rd. The 17th district takes in the municipalities of McLean and Bloomington; and southern Normal.

Fulton County is split between this district and the 15th district. They are partitioned by East Oscar Linn Highway. The 17th district takes in the municipalities of Canton, Cuba, and Farmington.

Peoria County is split between this district and the 16th district. They are partitioned by W Gerber Rd/W Rosenbohm Rd, W Southport Rd, BN & SF Railroad, W Southport Rd, N Townhouse Rd, W Cottonwood Rd, N McAllister Rd, W Greengold Rd, W Farmington Rd, N Kickapoo Creek Rd, Saint Mary's Cemetery, N Swords Ave, N Northcrest Dr, C & NW Railroad, Weaverridge Golf Club, W Charter Oak Rd, Illinois Highway 6, W War Memorial Dr, N Allen Rd, W Northmoor Rd, Big Hollow Creek, West Imperial Dr, West Willow Knolls Dr, North University St, Manning Park, West Teton Dr, Illinois Highway 40, North Prospect Rd, East Prospect Ln, North Montclair Ave, East Euclid Ave, North Grandview Dr, Forest Park Nature Center, Forest Park Apartments, North Galena Rd, Illinois Highway 29, and Forest Park Riverfront-Longshore. The 17th district takes in the municipalities of Hanna City, Glasford, and Elmwood; and most of Peoria.

From 2003 to 2013 the district was known as "the rabbit on a skateboard" for its unusual shape devised as the outcome of gerrymandering.

Election results from recent presidential races

List of members representing the district

Election results

2012

2014

2016

2018

2020

2022

See also
Illinois's congressional districts
List of United States congressional districts
Gerrymandering

Notes

References 

 Congressional Biographical Directory of the United States 1774–present

External links
Washington Post page on the 17th District of Illinois
U.S. Census Bureau - 17th District Fact Sheet
 

17
Calhoun County, Illinois
Constituencies established in 1873
1873 establishments in Illinois